Noabad Rural District is a rural district (dehestan) in Arvandkenar District, Abadan County, Khuzestan Province, Iran. At the 2006 census, its population was 174, in 39 families.  The rural district has 5 villages.

References 

Rural Districts of Khuzestan Province
Abadan County